Botswana competed at the 1992 Summer Olympics in Barcelona, Spain.

Competitors
The following is the list of number of competitors in the Games.

Results by event

Athletics
Men's 400 metres
Camera Ntereke

Men's 800 metres
Mbiganyi Thee

Men's 1500 metres
Bobby Gaseitsiwe

Men's 5000 metres
Zachariah Ditetso
 Heat — 13:54.88 (→ did not advance)

Men's Marathon
 Benjamin Keleketu — 2:45.57 (→ 83rd place)

Boxing
Men's Light-Heavyweight (– 81 kg) 
France Mabiletsa
Lost to Montell Griffin (USA), 4:10

See also
 Botswana at the 1990 Commonwealth Games
 Botswana at the 1994 Commonwealth Games

References

Sources
Official Olympic Reports
sports-reference

Nations at the 1992 Summer Olympics
1992
Olympics